Chattahoochee Industrial Railroad is a class III railroad located in southern Georgia.

It connects Cedar Springs, Hilton and Saffold over a 15-mile route, interconnecting with CSX Corporation and Norfolk Southern.

CIRR primarily serves Georgia-Pacific's Cedar Springs mill, a large containerboard facility. In 2002, CIRR hauled 19,561 carloads; most of them were paper pulp, and coal.  It was previously a Georgia Pacific subsidiary until 2004, when Georgia Pacific sold it and other railroad properties to Genesee & Wyoming Inc.

References

 Map of Chattahoochee Industrial Railroad - accessed August 22, 2009
 Railroad History - Chattahoochee Industrial Railroad - accessed August 22, 2009

Georgia (U.S. state) railroads
Genesee & Wyoming
Industrial railroads in the United States